Megher Pore Megh (meaning Clouds After Cloud) is a 2004 Bangladeshi Bengali language feature film. Directed by film director of Bangladesh Chashi Nazrul Islam. Based on the events of the Bangladesh Liberation War. An adaptation of the novel Megher Pore Megh by Rabeya Khatun. Produced by Faridur Reza Sagar and Ibne Hasan Khan in the banner of Impress Telefilm. Stars Riaz, Purnima, Mahfuz Ahmed and Shahidul Alam Sachchu, Riaz first time acting a duplicate character in this film such like Sezan and Majid.

Cast
 Riaz as Sezan Mahmud/Majid
 Purnima as Suraiya
 Mahfuz Ahmed as Nishat
 Shahidul Alam Sachchu as Rajakar
 Sejan as Swadhin Mahmud
 Khaleda Akter Kalpana as
 Jamilur Rahman Shakha as
 Uttam Guho as
 Abul Hossain as
 Washimul Bari Rajib as
 Ameer Sirajee as
 Tareque Sikder as

Awards and nomination

National Film Awards
 Best singer - Subur Nandi

Music
The music and the background score for the film is composed by Emon Saha.

Sound track
 Bhalobashi Sokale – Subir Nandi

References

External links
 
 Megher Pore Megh at the Rotten Tomatoes

2004 films
2004 romantic drama films
2000s war drama films
Bengali-language Bangladeshi films
Bangladeshi romantic drama films
Bangladeshi war drama films
War romance films
Films based on Bangladeshi novels
Films based on the Bangladesh Liberation War
Films set in 1971
Films scored by Emon Saha
1970s Bengali-language films
Impress Telefilm films